Tivoli Gardens Football Club is a Jamaican football club, based in Kingston. The club's senior team competes in the Jamaica Primer League. The club has won the Jamaica Primer League title 5 times and the JFF Champions Cup 3 times. Their home stadium is the Railway oval.

History
Founded in 1970, Tivoli Gardens Football Club was previously headed by former Prime Minister the late Rt Hon Edward Seaga, who served as Member of Parliament for forty years. Five-times national champions, they won their first Premier League title in 1983.

The club operates on lands previously home to the Jamaica Railway Corporation. The grounds are laid and the sight of old railcars. A number of major companies post their billboards on the complex which provides valuable cash to meet operational and development needs.

Recent seasons
The club won the National Premier League championship in 2003–04 and was runner up in 2004–05. They also won the Red Stripe Cup 2006, by overturning the fortunes of Portmore United, who led up to the 70th minute of play. They also won the 2008–09 Digicel Premier League on the final match day.

The senior coaches for the last years have been Glendon "Admiral" Bailey, who is well known in entertainment circles, and Calvert Fitzgerald, formerly of NPL rivals Waterhouse and Rivoli United who had been replaced by Desmond Francis for the 2007–08 season.

Achievements
CFU Club Championship: 0
Runner-up (1): 2004

Jamaica National Premier League: 5
1983, 1999, 2004, 2009, 2011

JFF Champions Cup: 3
1999, 2006, 2011

Former players

  Christopher Nicholas
  Ricardo Fuller
  Jermaine Johnson

Managers
 Calvert Fitzgerald (2006–07)
 Desmond Francis (2007)
 Glendon "Admiral" Bailey (2008)
 Lenworth Hyde sr. (2008–10)
 Desmond Francis (2010)
 Glendon "Admiral" Bailey (2010–2011)

External links
 Team profile at Golocaljamaica

References

Football clubs in Jamaica
Association football clubs established in 1970
Sport in Kingston, Jamaica
1970 establishments in Jamaica